Ioannis Skiadas (23 March 1913 – 7 September 1944) was a Greek hurdler. He competed in the men's 110 metres hurdles at the 1936 Summer Olympics.

Sources
 Evangelos Andreou: "The star of champion shone...The Balkan champion of  the interwar period, Giannis Skiadas” Ed. EUARCE 2011 (Ευάγγελος Ανδρέου, [http://www.biblionet.gr/book/159821/Ανδρέου,_Ευάγγελος/Το_αστέρι_του_πρωταθλητή_άναψε... Το αστέρι του πρωταθλητή άναψε... / ο βαλκανιονίκης του μεσοπολέμου Γιάννης Σκιαδάς], EUARCE 2011 ISBN 978-960-99566-0-4)

References

External links
 

1913 births
1944 deaths
Athletes (track and field) at the 1936 Summer Olympics
Greek male hurdlers
Olympic athletes of Greece
Place of birth missing
Athletes from Athens